Marian Kozerski (born 12 August 1945) is a Polish footballer. He played in eight matches for the Poland national football team from 1969 to 1971.

References

External links
 

1945 births
Living people
Polish footballers
Poland international footballers
Place of birth missing (living people)
Association footballers not categorized by position